Serbian Australians, are citizens of Australia who fully, or partially identify as Serbian by birth or descent. In the 2021 census there were 94,997 people in Australia of Serbian ancestry, making it a significant group with the global Serb diaspora.

History 
During the time of Federation a very small number of Serbs inhabited Australia. Despite a lack of accurate data it is assumed that ethnic Serbs deriving from Lika, Dalmatia and Montenegro did reside in largely mining communities throughout the Commonwealth, though exact numbers are unsubstantiated. The first significant, albeit small wave of Serbian migrants, comprising mostly former POWs, and displaced persons fleeing war and genocide began arriving in Australia as post-war immigrants. This initial wave also included members of the royalist Chetnik movement fleeing political persecution by the Communist regime of Josip Broz Tito.

The easing of emigration restrictions by Yugoslavia generated a second, larger wave of predominantly economic migration throughout the 1960s and 1970s. An agreement between Australia and Yugoslavia facilitated the recruitment of largely unskilled and semi-skilled immigrants, from predominantly rural backgrounds to work in Australia's manufacturing and construction industries. The developing political and economic issues in Yugoslavia during the 1980s, alongside its disintegration, ensuing wars, economic sanctions, and hyperinflation of the 1990s, resulted in the largest Serbian migration to Australia.

Classification issue
For many years Serbian Australians were classified "Yugoslavs" as flawed Australian census data failed to recognise the diverse ethnic groups within the former Yugoslavia. Questions regarding ancestral heritage were not included in any Australian census until 1986. From 1971- 1991 Yugoslavian nationals ranked 4th largest in Australia's post-war migrant intake. Census data has established that Serbs ranked 3rd within the Yugoslav immigrant pool, behind declared Croat and Macedonian ethnicities.

Demographics 

Serbian Australians comprise 0.36% of Australia's population, with 69.67% residing in the states of New South Wales and Victoria alone. Serbs reside mainly in state capitals and major metropolitan areas throughout Australia. The largest Serbian communities can be found predominantly in Melbourne's western and south-eastern suburbs, and in Sydney's south-eastern suburbs.

Ancestry

The Australian Bureau of Statistics allows the provision of two ancestries in a multi-response question. In the 2016 census there were 73,901 people in Australia of Serbian descent, 0.31% of the total population. 67.06% of Serbian Australians declared full Serbian ancestry. Individuals identifying as Serbian in the first response comprised 11.84%, whilst 21.09% declared Serbian heritage in the second response.

Countries of origin

Religion

Serbian Australians predominantly belong to the Serbian Orthodox Church of the Eastern Orthodox faith, estimated at approximately 75%. This is due to a statistical discrepancy amongst Serb Australians affiliated within the "Christianity (defined and not defined)" category in the 2016 Australian census. The largest religious body of Serbian Orthodox Australians is the Serbian Orthodox Eparchy of Australia and New Zealand, located in Alexandria, Sydney.

17.4% of Serbian Australians declared "No Religion/Not Stated", 5.7% "Roman Catholic" whilst 1.4% professed "other faith's".

Notable people 

 Alex Antic – Australian senator
 Eli Babalj – Soccer player
 Milan Blagojevic – Soccer player
 Pedj Bojic – Soccer player
 Nick Cotric - Rugby league player
 Nik Cubrilovic - Hacker and internet security expert.
 Miloš Degenek – Soccer player
 Biljana Dekic – Chess player
 Bobby Despotovski – Soccer player and coach
 Bronko Djura - Cricket and Rugby league player
 Dirty South – Musician
 Jelena Dokić – Tennis player
 Dragan Durdevic – Rugby league player 
 Ivan Ergić – Soccer player
 Vedrana Grbović – Model
 Dan Ilic – Comedian 
 Luke Ivanovic – Soccer player
 Milan Ivanović – Soccer player
 Marko Jesic – Soccer player
 Robert Jovicic – Immigration case
 Sam Kekovich – Australian Rules footballer & media personality
 Ksenija Lukich – Model & TV presenter
 Aleks Marić – Basketball player
 Steven Marković – Basketball player
 Zdravko Micevic – Boxer
 Katrina Milosevic - Actress
 Danny Milosevic – Soccer player
 Nik Mrdja – Soccer player
 Andrew Nikolic – Australian politician and former Australian Army Brigadier
 Bojana Novakovic – Actress
 Abdullah Numan – Mufti of Serbia
 Tom Opacic - Rugby League player
 Andreja Pejic – Model.
 Vedrana Popovic – Soccer player
 Monika Radulovic – Model
 Rale Rašić – Soccer coach,
player and media personality 
 Nikola Roganovic – Soccer player
 Tom Rogic – Soccer player
 Siluan - Metropolitan of Australia and New Zealand
 Karl Stefanovic – TV presenter & journalist 
 Peter Stefanovic – TV presenter & journalist
 Daniel Subotic – Socialite
 Aleksandar Šušnjar – Soccer player
 Vuko Tomasevic – Soccer player
 Nick Cotric - Rugby league player
 Jake Trbojevic – Rugby league player
 Tom Trbojevic – Rugby league player
 Doug Utjesenovic - Soccer player
 Holly Valance – Actress, singer and model
 Olympia Valance – Model and actress
 Dragan Vasiljković – Serbian paramilitary leader 
 Lazar Vidovic – Australian rules footballer
 Tyla-Jay Vlajnic - Soccer player
 Nick Vujicic – Christian evangelist 
 Danny Vukovic – Soccer player
 B. Wongar – Writer
 Ursula Yovich – Actress and singer
 Lew Zivanovic – Rugby league player
 Alexandar Popovic – Soccer player

Sports 
 List of Serbian soccer clubs in Australia

See also 

 Australian-Serbian relations
 European Australians
 Europeans in Oceania
 Immigration to Australia
 Serbian New Zealanders
 Serbian diaspora
 Serbian Americans
 Serbian Canadians

Annotations

References

External links 
Ancestry by Birthplace – Results of 2001 Australian census

 
 
 
Serbian diaspora
Immigration to Australia
European Australian
Serb diaspora